Nilson Taty Sousa Vaz (born 15 November 1987), simply known as Nilson, is a São Toméan footballer who plays as a goalkeeper for Sporting Praia Cruz and the São Tomé and Príncipe national team.

International career
Nilson made his international debut for São Tomé and Príncipe in 2011.

References

1987 births
Living people
Association football goalkeepers
São Tomé and Príncipe footballers
São Tomé and Príncipe international footballers
Sporting Praia Cruz players